The 2001 British Columbia general election was the 37th provincial election in the Province of British Columbia, Canada. It was held to elect members of the Legislative Assembly of British Columbia. The election was called on April 18, 2001 and held on May 16, 2001. Voter turnout was 55.4 per cent of all eligible voters.

The incumbent British Columbia New Democratic Party (BC NDP), in office since 1991, had been rocked by two major scandals—the Fast Ferries Scandal and a bribery scandal involving Premier Glen Clark.  With the NDP's ratings flatlining, Clark resigned in August 1999, and Deputy Premier Dan Miller took over as caretaker premier until Ujjal Dosanjh was elected his permanent successor in February. Dosanjh was not, however, able to restore the party's public image, and the BC NDP suffered a resounding defeat at the hands of the British Columbia Liberal Party (BC Liberals), led by former Vancouver mayor Gordon Campbell.  The BC Liberals won over 57% of the popular vote, and an unprecedented 77 of the 79 seats in the provincial legislature—the largest victory in the province's electoral history.

The BC NDP, on the other hand, suffered a near-total political collapse. The party lost almost half of the share of the popular vote that it had won in the 1996 election, while its seat count fell from 39 seats to only two—those of Deputy Premier and Education Minister Joy MacPhail and Community Development Minister Jenny Kwan. It was easily the worst defeat of a sitting government in British Columbia. It was also the second-worst defeat of a sitting provincial government in Canada, eclipsed only by the New Brunswick election of 1987, the Alberta election of 1935, and the Prince Edward Island election of 1935. In those elections, the governing party–the New Brunswick Tories, the United Farmers of Alberta and the PEI Tories–was completely wiped off the map.  Dosanjh resigned as party leader soon after the election; he had actually conceded defeat a week before voters went to the polls. Despite being the only other party in the Assembly, the BC NDP lacked the four seats required for official party status.

The British Columbia Unity Party had been created as a union of conservative parties. Initially, Reform BC, the Social Credit, the British Columbia Party, and the Family Coalition Party had joined under the "BC Unity" umbrella.  By the time the election was called, however, only the Family Coalition Party and a large majority of Reform BC segments had remained in the BC Unity coalition. The other parties had withdrawn to continue independently. Ron Gamble, sometime leader and sometime president of the renewed Reform BC continued his opposition to conservative mergers, consistently proclaiming a "Say No to Chris Delaney & BC Unity" policy, until Unity's eventual collapse in 2004 after a failed second attempt at a merger with BC Conservatives.

Results

Notes

x - less than 0.005% of the popular vote.

* The party did not nominate candidates in the previous election.

Unity Party results are calculated relative to Family Coalition Party results.

Riding results

Names in bold indicate party leaders, cabinet ministers and former premiers.  Incumbents denoted with a dagger (†) did not seek re-election.

Northern British Columbia

|-
|bgcolor=whitesmoke|Bulkley Valley-Stikine
|
|Bill Goodacre  2,823
||
|Dennis MacKay  7,414
|
|Rolf Hussinger  856
|
|Trevor McKilligan  507
|
|Rod Taylor  1,190
|
|Theresa Tait (ANP) 405Bill Forsyth (BC)  62
||
|Bill Goodacre
|-
|bgcolor=whitesmoke|North Coast
|
|Colleen Fitzpatrick  4,084
||
|Bill Belsey  4,915
|
|David Konsmo  560
|
|Kenneth Peerless  623
|
|Clarence Hall  152
|
|Emily Bolton (ANP)  526
||
|Dan Miller †
|-
|bgcolor=whitesmoke|Peace River North
|
|Brian Churchill  1,047
||
|Richard Neufeld  6,629
|
|
|
|Paul Renaud  810
|
|Roy Daniel Strange  568
|
|
||
|Richard Neufeld
|-
|bgcolor=whitesmoke|Peace River South
|
||Elmer Kabush  767
||
|Blair Lekstrom  6,393
|
|Stacy LaJeunesse  407
|
|Michelle Rainey-Fenkarek  444
|
|Garret Golhof  225
|
|Grant Mitton (SC)  1,726
||
|Jack Weisgerber †
|-
|bgcolor=whitesmoke|Prince George-Mount Robson
|
|Todd Whitcombe  2,655
||
|Shirley Bond  8,033
|
|Lelani Arris  1,429
|
|Andrej DeWolf  744
|
|Bob Zayonc  1,110
|
|Erle Martz (Ref.)  445
||
|Lois Boone †
|-
|bgcolor=whitesmoke|Prince George North
|
|Bryan Llewellyn  2,148
||
|Pat Bell  9,215
|
|Hilary Crowley  1,137
|
|Robert Grimsrud  588
|
|David G. Low  838
|
|Lisa Maskell (WR) 621Fred McLeod (Ind.) 478Leif Jensen (Ind.)  76
||
|Paul Ramsey †
|-
|bgcolor=whitesmoke|Prince George-Omineca
|
||Ed John  3,156
||
|Paul Nettleton  10,469
|
|David Usher  1,026
|
|Will DeWolf  646
|
|Eldon Matte  1,168
|
|
|| 
|Paul Nettleton
|-
|bgcolor=whitesmoke|Skeena
|
|Helmut Giesbrecht  2,644
||
|Roger Harris  8,653
|
|Roger Benham  695
|
|Bob Erb  810
|
|
|
|Gerald Amos (ANP)  479
||
|Helmut Giesbrecht
|-

Kootenay, Columbia and Boundary

|-
|bgcolor=whitesmoke|Columbia River-Revelstoke
|
|Jim Doyle4,465
||
|Wendy McMahon7,659
|
|Jennifer Brownlee946
|
|Lisa Kirkman616
|
|Miles Lehn484
|
| 
||
|Jim Doyle
|-
|bgcolor=whitesmoke|East Kootenay
|
|Erda Walsh3,502
||
|Bill Bennett9,771
|
|Joni Krats1,229
|
|Fred Sima670
|
|Bruce Parke621
|
| 
||
|Erda Walsh
|-
|bgcolor=whitesmoke|Nelson-Creston
|
|Corky Evans6,626
||
|Blair Suffredine8,161
|
|Colleen McCrory4,354
|
|Dan Loehndorf540
|
|Stephen Cox1,064
| 
|
||
|Corky Evans
|-
|bgcolor=whitesmoke|West Kootenay-Boundary
|
|Ed Conroy6,376
||
|Sandy Santori9,718
|
|Patricia Pepe1,796
|
|Brian Taylor785
|
|Mark McLaren1,065
|
| 
||
|Ed Conroy
|-

Okanagan and Shuswap

|-
|bgcolor=whitesmoke|Kelowna-Lake Country
|
|Janet Scotland3,102
||
|John Weisbeck14,093
|
|Devra Rice2,606
|
|Paul Halonen734
|
|Kevin Wendland1,496
|
|David Thomson (Act)272
||
|John Weisbeck
|-
|bgcolor=whitesmoke|Kelowna-Mission
|
|Assunta Rossal3,066
||
|Sindi Hawkins15,351
|
|Angela Reid2,588
|
|Kelly Nichol787
|
|Paul Vogan1,674
|
|Grant Baudais (Act)296
||
|Sindi Hawkins
|-
|bgcolor=whitesmoke|Okanagan-Vernon
|
|Troy Sebastien3,529
||
|Tom Christensen13,868
|
|Erin Nelson2,214
|
|Michael Jones917
|
|Doug MacDonald3,213
|
|Herb Wong (Ind.)562Kathleen Daniels (Ind.)157Andrew Hokold (Pat)82
||
|April Sanders †
|-
|bgcolor=whitesmoke|Okanagan-Westside
|
|Ernie Ursuliak3,176
||
|Rick Thorpe14,181
|
| 
|
|Teresa Taylor1,188
|
|Howard Lionel Hunt1,364
|
|Jack Peach (Act)921
||
|Rick Thorpe
|-
|bgcolor=whitesmoke|Penticton-Okanagan Valley
|
|Naga Terada3,887
||
|Bill Barisoff15,609
|
|Harry Naegal3,524
|
|Riley Goldstone786
|
|Walter Ozero553
|
|Kal Gidda (BC)522
||
|Bill Barisoff
|-
|bgcolor=whitesmoke|Shuswap
|
|Wayne Fowler3,788
||
|George Abbott12,950
|
|Larissa Lutjen2,423
|
|Paddy Roberts835
|
|Al Thiessen2,857
|
|Jeanette McLennan (Ind.)119Scott Yee (Cen)41
||
|George Abbott

Thompson and Cariboo

|-
|bgcolor=whitesmoke|Cariboo North
|
|Frank Garden2,732
||
|John Wilson10,044
|
|Douglas Gook712
|
|Stephen Payne509
|
|Steven McBeth420
|
|Kim McIvor (Ind.)727
Al Charlebois (PF)24
||
|John Wilson
|-
|bgcolor=whitesmoke|Cariboo South
|
|David Zirnhelt4,259
||
|Walt Cobb10,259
|
|
|
|Mike Orr739
|
|Christopher Matte598
|
|Dan Case (AN)552
Bruce Broomfield (PF)83
||
|David Zirnhelt
|-
|bgcolor=whitesmoke|Kamloops
|
|Cathy McGregor4,592
||
|Claude Richmond12,258
|
|Joe Teichman2,180
|
|Julian Gushulak707
|
|Ruth Watson430
|
|Ernie Schmidt (Ind.)193
||
|Cathy McGregor
|-
|bgcolor=whitesmoke|Kamloops-North Thompson
|
|Dwayne Hartle4,181
||
|Kevin Krueger12,676
|
|Denis Walsh3,122
|
|Vern Falk1025
|
|Bob Altenhofen836
|
| 
||
|Kevin Krueger
|-
|bgcolor=whitesmoke|Yale-Lillooet
|
|Victor York2,817
||
|David Chutter9,845
|
|Harue Kanemitsu1,657
|
|Vincent Royer807
|
| 
|
|Don Moses (AN)1126Dorothy-Jean O'Donnell (PF)136
||
|Harry Lali †
|-

Fraser Valley

|-
|bgcolor=whitesmoke|Abbotsford-Clayburn
|
|Kris Lind2,096
||
|John van Dongen12,584
|
| 
|
|John Fulford706
|
|Peter Stiegelmar1751
|
|Kenneth Keillor (F)217
||
|John van Dongen
|-
|bgcolor=whitesmoke|Abbotsford-Mount Lehman
|
|Taranjit Purewal2,431
||
|Mike de Jong12,660
|
|Karl Hann1,299
|
|Brian Carlisle451
|
|Gloria Ewert1576
|
|David MacKay (PF)Robert McCulloch (F)46
||
|Mike de Jong
|-
|bgcolor=whitesmoke|Chilliwack-Kent
|
|Malcolm James2,155
||
|Barry Penner13,814
|
|Larry Commodore1,511
|
|David Ferguson968
|
| 
|
| 
||
|Barry Penner
|-
|bgcolor=whitesmoke|Chilliwack-Sumas
|
|Christine Muise2,434
||
|John Les14,137
|
|Norm Siefken1,130
|
| 
|
| 
|
|Grant Cepuran (Con)1,199
|colspan="2" bgcolor="whitesmoke" align="center"|new district
|-
|bgcolor=whitesmoke|Fort Langley-Aldergrove
|
|Simon Challenger2,619
||
|Rich Coleman16,527
|
|Andrea Welling2,766
|
|Joshua McKenzie674
|
|Deanna Jopling1,275
|
|Murray Dunbar (Ind.)336
||
|Rich Coleman
|-
|bgcolor=whitesmoke|Langley
|
|Paul Latham2,720
||
|Lynn Stephens14,564
|
|Pat Taylor2,847
|
|Mavis Becker723
|
|Gordon Nelson1,605
|
| 
||
|Lynn Stephens
|-
|bgcolor=whitesmoke|Maple Ridge-Mission
|
|Rose Bennett4,710
||
|Randy Hawes12,920
|
|Dawn Paley2,910
|
|Denise Briere-Smart908
|
|David Ritchie1,037
|
|Dale Randall (Ind.)252Chum Richardson (Ind.)63
||
|Dennis Streifel†
|-
|bgcolor=whitesmoke|Maple Ridge-Pitt Meadows
|
|Bill Hartley5,764
||
|Ken Stewart12,235
|
|Mike Gildersleeve3,069
|
|Rick Cameron716
|
|Dave Hensman1,220
|
|Michael Felgner (Act)97
||
|Bill Hartley
|}

Surrey

|-
|bgcolor=whitesmoke|Surrey-Cloverdale
|
|Steve Oakley2,333
||
|Kevin Falcon13,739
|
|Steve Chitty2,227
|
|Jason Elliott481
|
|George Hoytema1,112
|
|Bonnie McKinnon (Ind.)1,669
||
|Bonnie McKinnon
|-
|bgcolor=whitesmoke|Surrey-Green Timbers
|
|Sue Hammell5,592
||
|Brenda Locke7,539
|
|
|
|Dennis Kalsi561
|
|C. Lewis Robinson1,067
|
|Jim Paterson (Ref.) 538
Harjit Daudharia (Com)103
||
|Sue Hammell
|-
|bgcolor=whitesmoke|Surrey-Newton
|
|Param Grewal3,949
||
|Tony Bhullar6,750
|
|David Walters1,673
|
|Stephen Kawamoto348
|
|Paul Joshi498
|
|Margaret Bridgman (Ref.)431
||
|Penny Priddy †
|-
|bgcolor=whitesmoke|Surrey-Panorama Ridge
|
|Bruce Ralston3,240
||
|Gulzar Cheema9,590
|
|Sunny Athwal1,437
|
|Randy Caine424
|
|Heather Stilwell1,123
|
|Shirley Abraham (Ref.)408Ed Weiland (Act)50
|colspan="2" bgcolor="whitesmoke" align="center"|new district
|-
|bgcolor=whitesmoke|Surrey-Tynehead
|
|Barry Bell3,159
||
|Dave Hayer12,252
|
|Joel Macht1,876
|
|Don Briere385
|
|Bill Stilwell1,234
|
|Marilyn Collins (Ind.)880Enoch Ephraimson265 (Ref.)Mandir Benipal (Ind.)50
|colspan="2" bgcolor="whitesmoke" align="center"|new district
|-
|bgcolor=whitesmoke|Surrey-Whalley
|
|Joan Smallwood4,536
||
|Elayne Brenzinger6,693
|
|Terry McComas1,652
|
|Khalid Arnaout544
|
|John A. Conway838
|
|Mike Runte (Ref.)374
||
|Joan Smallwood
|-
|bgcolor=whitesmoke|Surrey-White Rock
|
|Matt Todd3,415
||
|Gordon Hogg18,678
|
|Ruth Christine3,577
|
|David Bourgeois536
|
|Garry Sahl983
|
|
||
|Gordon Hogg
|-
|}

Richmond and Delta

|-
|bgcolor=whitesmoke|Delta North
|
|Norm Lortie
||
|Reni Masi
|
|John Hague
|
|Iain Gilfillan
|
|Dario Todorovic
|
|
||
|Reni Masi
|-
|bgcolor=whitesmoke|Delta South
|
|Ruth Mary Adams
||
|Val Roddick
|
|Rob LaBelle
|
|Mike Hansen
|
|Justin P. Goodrich
|
|George Mann (Ind.)Paul Dhillon (Ind.)
||
|Val Roddick
|-
|bgcolor=whitesmoke|Richmond Centre
|
|Jaana Grant
||
|Greg Halsey-Brandt
|
|Bruce Marshall
|
|Alice Kan-Halford
|
|Jim Hessels
|
|Frank Tofin (Con.)
||
|Doug Symons†
|-
|bgcolor=whitesmoke|Richmond East
|
|Willy Nasgowitz
||
|Linda Reid
|
|Stephen Kronstein
|
|John Shavluk
|
|Joe Pal
|
|Mohamaud Farah (Ind.)
||
|Linda Reid
|-
|bgcolor=whitesmoke|Richmond-Steveston
|
|Billie Mortimer
||
|Geoff Plant
|
|Kevan Hudson
|
|Gordon Mathias
|
|Vincent Paul
|
|Allan Warnke (Ind.)Barry Chilton (Con.)Sue Wade (Ref.)Edith Petersen (PF)
||
|Geoff Plant
|}

Vancouver's Eastern Suburbs

|-
|bgcolor=whitesmoke|Burnaby-Edmonds
|
|Sav Dhaliwal4,691
||
|Patty Sahota9,119
|
|Eric Hawthorne2,476
|
|Roy Arjun426
|
|Grant Murray1,076
|
|Gordon S. Watson (POC)112
||
|Fred Randall †
|-
|bgcolor=whitesmoke|Burnaby North
|
|Pietro Calendino5,735
||
|Richard Lee10,520
|
|Tom Hetherington2,669
|
|Dale Ware415
|
| 
|
|
||
|Pietro Calendino
|-
|bgcolor=whitesmoke|Burnaby-Willingdon
|
|Dave Myles3,737
||
|John Nuraney8,338
|
|Joe Keithley2,347
|
|Pamela Zak313
|
| 
|
|Dennis MacAuley (COBC)243
||
|Joan Sawicki †
|-
|bgcolor=whitesmoke|Burquitlam
|
|Bart Healey4,475
||
|Harry Bloy10,333
|
|Steven J. Mancinelli3,085
|
|Peter Grin630
|
|Greg Watrich720
|
|
|colspan="2" bgcolor="whitesmoke" align="center"|new district
|-
|bgcolor=whitesmoke|Coquitlam-Maillardville
|
|Ken Landgraff4,148
||
|Richard Stewart10,692
|
|Elly Petersen2,354
|
|Paul Geddes544
|
|Tim Bonner796
|
|Harry Warren (Ind.)Doug Stead (Ind.)160
||
|John Cashore†
|-
|bgcolor=whitesmoke|New Westminster
|
|Graeme Bowbrick6,688
||
|Joyce Murray10,626
|
|Robert Broughton2,799
|
|Marlene P. Campbell799
|
|Howard Irving571
|
|
||
|Graeme Bowbrick
|-
|bgcolor=whitesmoke|Port Coquitlam-Burke Mountain
|
|Mike Farnworth6,964
||
|Karn Manhas9,584
|
|Kelli Gallagher1,765
|
|Doug Hewer412
|
|Chris Delaney2,236
|
|Clay Fanstone (Ref.)145
Craig Braconnier (Ind.)144
||
|Mike Farnworth
|-
|bgcolor=whitesmoke|Port Moody-Westwood
|
|Brian Revel4,045
||
|Christy Clark15,967
|
| 
|
|Graeme Smecher1,359
|
|
|
|
||
|Christy Clark
|}

Vancouver

|-
|bgcolor=whitesmoke|Vancouver-Burrard
|
|Tim Stevenson7,359
||
|Lorne Mayencourt11,396
|
|Robbie Mattu3,826
|
|Marc Emery906
|
|
|
|Boris Bear (Ind.)136Joseph Theriault (PF)40Helvis (Rhino)25
||
|Tim Stevenson
|-
|bgcolor=whitesmoke|Vancouver-Fairview
|
|Anita Romaniuk4,772
||
|Gary Farrell-Collins12,864
|
|Vanessa Violini5,051
|
|Ron MacIntyre651
|
|
|
|Brian Sproule (PF)76
||
|Gary Farrell-Collins
|-
|bgcolor=whitesmoke|Vancouver-Fraserview
|
|Ian Waddell5,815
||
|Ken Johnston10,361
|
|Merina Matthew1,417
|
|Paul Emerson Hughes267
|
|Paul Stilwell369
|
|
||
|Ian Waddell
|-
|bgcolor=whitesmoke|Vancouver-Hastings
||
|Joy MacPhail8,009
|
|Daniel Lee7,600
|
|Ian Gregson2,874
|
|Davin Ouimet409
|
|
|
|Carrol B. Woolsey (SC)222Charles Boyland (PF)119
||
|Joy MacPhail
|-
|bgcolor=whitesmoke|Vancouver-Kensington
|
|Ujjal Dosanjh7,478
||
|Patrick Wong9,162
|
|Betty Krawczyk1,795
|
|John Gordon516
|
|John O'Flynn314
|
|
||
|Ujjal Dosanjh
|-
|bgcolor=whitesmoke|Vancouver-Kingsway
|
|Alicia Barsallo5,429
||
|Rob Nijjar8,264
|
|Geoff Lyon1,725
|
|Steven M. Lay364
|
|Sal Vetro541
|
|Tyler Ducharme (COBC)159
Donna Petersen (PF)81
||
|Glen Clark †
|-
|bgcolor=whitesmoke|Vancouver-Langara
|
|Peter G. Prontzos2,999
||
|Val Anderson11,800
|
|Doug Warkentin2,009
|
|Anthony Campbell673
|
|
|
|Joe Young (Ind.)105Michael Hill (PF)51
||
|Val Anderson
|-
|bgcolor=whitesmoke|Vancouver-Mount Pleasant
||
|Jenny Kwan7,163
|
|Gail Sparrow5,343
|
|Dale Hofmann2,612
|
|David Malmo-Levine489
|
|Ken Wright166
|
|Liar Liar (Ind.)148
Kimball Cariou (Com)142
Franklin Poley (POC)42
||
|Jenny Kwan
|-
|bgcolor=whitesmoke|Vancouver-Point Grey
|
|Am Johal4,441
||
|Gordon Campbell13,430
|
|Varya Rubin5,094
|
|Alex Curylo659
|
|Greg Dahms257
|
|Anne Jamieson (PF)43
||
|Gordon Campbell
|-
|bgcolor=whitesmoke|Vancouver-Quilchena
|
|Gareth Richmond2,168
||
|Colin Hansen16,829
|
|Judy Johnstone3,277
|
|Katrina Chowe351
|
| 
|
|Mike Sharp (Ind.)160
||
|Colin Hansen
|}

North Shore and Sunshine Coast

|-
|bgcolor=whitesmoke|North Vancouver-Lonsdale
|
|Roger Kishi3,016
||
|Katherine Whittred11,362
|
|Terry W. Long3,823
|
|Darin Keith Neil612
|
|
|
|Jonathan Cote (Ind.)173
||
|Katherine Whittred
|-
|bgcolor=whitesmoke|North Vancouver-Seymour
|
|Sheila Paterson2,751
||
|Daniel Jarvis15,568
|
|Evelyn Kirkaldy4,127
|
|Tom Dreyer568
|
| 
|
|Ron Gamble (Ref.)683Chris McKenzie (Ind.)209
||
|Daniel Jarvis
|-
|bgcolor=whitesmoke|Powell River-Sunshine Coast
|
|Gordon Wilson 6,349
||
|Harold Long 9,904
|
|Adriane Carr 6,316
|
|Dana Larsen 812
|
| 
|
|
||
|Gordon Wilson
|-
|bgcolor=whitesmoke|West Vancouver-Capilano
|
|Matt Lovick1,284
||
|Ralph Sultan15,556
|
|Nora Gambioli2,932
|
|Keir Vichert274
|
| 
|
|Jeremy Dalton (Ind.)1,355
||
|Jeremy Dalton
|-
|bgcolor=whitesmoke|West Vancouver-Garibaldi
|
|Barrie MacLeod2,330
||
|Ted Nebbeling14,542
|
|Peter Tatroff3,691
|
|Robert Adam767
|
| 
|
|
||
|Ted Nebbeling
|}

Vancouver Island

|-
|bgcolor=whitesmoke|Alberni-Qualicum
|
|Gerard Janssen7,395
||
|Gillian Trumper13,109
|
|Sergio Paone2,999
|
|Nicholas Thorp1,081
|
|
|
|
||
|Gerard Janssen
|-
|bgcolor=whitesmoke|Comox Valley
|
|Evelyn Gillespie5,356
||
|Stan Hagen15,569
|
|Pam Munroe5,170
|
|Sylvain Beaudoin873
|
|John William Robinson677
|
|
||
|Evelyn Gillespie
|-
|bgcolor=whitesmoke|Cowichan-Ladysmith
|
|Rob Hutchins7,783
||
|Graham Bruce12,707
|
|Loren Duncan3,250
|
|Larry Kunz597
|
| 
|
|
||
|Jan Pullinger †
|-
|bgcolor=whitesmoke|Nanaimo
|
|Leonard Krog6,602
||
|Mike Hunter9,748
|
|Doug Catley3,810
|
|Donald LaVallee889
|
|Steve Miller588
|
|Brunie Brunie (Ind.)199
||
|Dale Lovick †
|-
|bgcolor=whitesmoke|Nanaimo-Parksville
|
|Jamie Brennan5,852
||
|Judith Reid17,356
|
|Phil Carson3,192
|
|Leonard Melman634
|
|Daniel Stelmacker693
|
|
||
|Judith Reid
|-
|bgcolor=whitesmoke|North Island
|
|Glenn Robertson6,375
||
|Rod Visser13,781
|
|Ralph Keller2,871
|
|Noreen Evers1,099
|
|
|
|
||
|Glenn Robertson
|}

Greater Victoria

|-
|bgcolor=whitesmoke|Esquimalt-Metchosin
|
|Maurine Karagianis 6,258
||
|Arnie Hamilton 9,544
|
|Marilyn Sundeen3,685
|
|Christopher Davies 534
|
|Bob Ward 268
|
|Bill Clarke (Con)322Rick Berglund (Ind.)105Scott Attrill (Ind.)68Gerry McVeigh (Ind.)57
||
|Moe Sihota †
|-
|bgcolor=whitesmoke|Malahat-Juan de Fuca
|
|Richard Hughes3,687
||
|Brian Kerr9,676
|
|Stephen Bradley3,275
|
|Ron Anderton547
|
|Julie Mander323
|
|Rick Kasper (Ind.) 5,164
Susan Power (Con) 222
||
|Rick Kasper
|-
|bgcolor=whitesmoke|Oak Bay-Gordon Head
|
|Charley Beresford 5,789
||
|Ida Chong 14,588
|
|Cristin Geall 4,666
|
|Michael Mann 411
|
| 
|
|
||
|Ida Chong
|-
|bgcolor=whitesmoke|Saanich North and the Islands
|
|Paul Sam  5,011
||
|Murray Coell  15,406
|
|Andrew Lewis  7,211
|
|Christina Racki  491
|
| 
|
|Bathar Jensen (Ind.)  257
||
|Murray Coell
|-
|bgcolor=whitesmoke|Saanich South
|
|David Cubberley 6,838
||
|Susan Brice 12,699
|
|Gracie MacDonald 3,823
|
|Tamara Tulloch 462
|
| 
|
|Paul Scrimger (Con.)349James Robert Lauder (Ind.)172
||
|Andrew Petter †
|-
|bgcolor=whitesmoke|Victoria-Beacon Hill
|
|Carole James 9,262
||
|Jeff Bray 9,297
|
|Walter Meyer Zu Erpen 5,453
|
|Troy Tompkins 532
|
|Gregory Hartnell 290
|
|Rob Botterell (Ind.)205Kirsten Goodacre (Com)64
||
|Gretchen Brewin †
|-
|bgcolor=whitesmoke|Victoria-Hillside
|
|Steve Orcherton 7,796
||
|Sheila Orr 7,878
|
|Stuart Hertzog 4,142
|
|Chuck Beyer 663
|
|Allan Whittal 293
|
|George Gidora (Com)72Laery Braaten (CCF)49
||
|Steve Orcherton
|}

See also
List of British Columbia political parties

References

Further reading

External links
Elections BC 2001 Election

2001
2001 elections in Canada
2001 in British Columbia
May 2001 events in Canada